John Arthur Paisley (August 25, 1923 – September 24, 1978) was a former official of the Central Intelligence Agency.

Early life
When Paisley was two-years-old, his father left the family. He was raised by his grandparents when his mother went to work as a practical nurse.

Career
Paisley served in the CIA from 1963 to 1974. During his career, he was heavily involved in Soviet operations.

Paisley retired as deputy director in the Office of Strategic Research, the branch that monitored Soviet military movements and nuclear capabilities.

Later life and death
Around 1976, Paisley and Maryann separated. In December 1977 and March 1978, he attended two five-day "personal awareness" seminars conducted by Lifespring. According to Paisley's psychiatrist, Paisley began attending individual and group psychotherapy sessions in April.

On September 24, 1978, Paisley disappeared after setting sail on the Chesapeake Bay with his sloop Brillig. On October 1, his body was found floating in the Bay near the mouth of the Patuxent River with a gunshot wound to his head and a weighted dive belt around his waist. His boat was found the previous week run aground.

Shortly after his death, the psychiatrist stated Paisley was to attend a group therapy session in Chevy Chase, Maryland on September 26 with his estranged wife to discuss the failure of their marriage. He speculated that due to personal developments Paisley may have been experiencing "feelings of loss and abandonment".

Senate inquiry
Due to the circumstances of Paisley's death and press speculation, the United States Senate Select Committee on Intelligence (SSCI) opened an inquiry in order to determine if his death was due to his activities with the CIA. After a two year investigation and three public statements, the SSCI reported that it "found no information to support the allegations that Mr. Paisley's death was connected in some way to involvement in foreign intelligence or counterintelligence matters."

In 1989, Crown Publishers put out Widows, a book by William R. Corson, Susan B. Trento, and Joseph J. Trento that stated the CIA failed to properly investigate the deaths of Paisley and two other CIA officials, Nicholas Shadrin and Ralph Sigler. The authors state that the body discovered in the  Chesapeake Bay was not Paisley's.

In 2022, Harper published "The Spy who Knew Too Much", by Howard Blum, in which the author maintains that Paisley was exfiltrated by the USSR and his death in the US was staged.

See also
John Barth's 1982 Sabbatical: A Romance

Notes

References

1923 births
1978 deaths
People of the Central Intelligence Agency